Arthur Thomas Phelan (August 14, 1887 – December 27, 1964) was a professional baseball infielder in the Major Leagues from 1910 to 1915, who played for the Chicago Cubs and Cincinnati Reds.

External links

1887 births
1964 deaths
Chicago Cubs players
Cincinnati Reds players
Major League Baseball infielders
Baseball players from Illinois
Minor league baseball managers
Birmingham Barons players
Kansas City Blues (baseball) players
Chattanooga Lookouts players
Galveston Pirates players
Fort Worth Panthers players
Shreveport Sports players
Kewanee Boilermakers players
Taylorville Tailors players
People from Macon County, Illinois